The Greeley County Courthouse in Greeley, Nebraska was built in 1913–14.  It was designed by architects Berlinghof & Davis in Classical Revival style.  It was listed on the National Register of Historic Places in 1990.

It is a three-story building on a basement, with foundation and trim of gold-hued limestone, and walls of greyish-tan brick. It has been described as "a good example of the work of Nebraska architect George A. Berlinghof (here as Berlinghof & Davis), representing the evolution of his designs. The courthouse is a less elaborate version of the Howard County Courthouse built in 1912-15 in the next county south of Greeley."

A former pumphouse is a second contributing building on the property.

References

External links

Courthouses on the National Register of Historic Places in Nebraska
Neoclassical architecture in Nebraska
Government buildings completed in 1914
County courthouses in Nebraska
National Register of Historic Places in Greeley County, Nebraska